Csiba is the Hungarian name for two villages in Romania:

Ciba village, Miercurea-Ciuc City, Harghita County
Ciba village, Câmpeni Commune, Mureș County